Matthew "Matty" Maher (1854 – 14 October 1931) was an Irish hurler who played for the Tipperary senior team.

Maher made his first appearance for the team during the 1887 championship and was a regular member of the panel at various times until his retirement after the 1894 championship. During that time he won one All-Ireland medal.

At club level, Maher was a one-time county club championship medalist with Thurles.

References

1854 births
1931 deaths
Thurles Sarsfields hurlers
Tipperary inter-county hurlers
All-Ireland Senior Hurling Championship winners